Dominika Sztandera (born 19 January 1997) is a Polish swimmer. She competed in the women's 100 metre breaststroke event at the 2017 World Aquatics Championships. In 2014, she represented Poland at the 2014 Summer Youth Olympics held in Nanjing, China.

References

External links
 

1997 births
Living people
Polish female breaststroke swimmers
Place of birth missing (living people)
Swimmers at the 2014 Summer Youth Olympics